Notiothops is a genus of Chilean palp-footed spiders that was first described by Norman I. Platnick, C. J. Grismado & M. J. Ramírez in 1999.

Species
 it contains eight species, found only in Chile:
Notiothops birabeni (Zapfe, 1961) – Chile
Notiothops campana Platnick, Grismado & Ramírez, 1999 – Chile
Notiothops cekalovici Platnick, Grismado & Ramírez, 1999 – Chile
Notiothops huaquen Platnick, Grismado & Ramírez, 1999 – Chile
Notiothops llolleo Platnick, Grismado & Ramírez, 1999 – Chile
Notiothops maulensis (Platnick, 1985) – Chile
Notiothops noxiosus Platnick, Grismado & Ramírez, 1999 (type) – Chile
Notiothops penai Platnick, Grismado & Ramírez, 1999 – Chile

See also
 List of Palpimanidae species

References

Araneomorphae genera
Palpimanidae
Spiders of South America
Endemic fauna of Chile